, is a popularized version of the battle standard used by the Sengoku period daimyō Takeda Shingen. The banner quoted four phrases from Sun Tzu's The Art of War: "as swift as wind, as gentle as forest, as fierce as fire, as unshakable as mountain."

Original version
The original version of the banner is mentioned in the Kōyō Gunkan, a record of the military exploits of the Takeda clan. It is based on four phrases from Sun Tzu, which in the original Chinese appear in two consecutive passages:

Chapter 7, passage 17: 	"故其疾如風，其徐如林" Let your rapidity be that of the wind, your gentleness that of the forest.

Chapter 7, passage 18: "侵掠如火，不動如山" In raiding and plundering be like fire, be immovable like a mountain.

Four-character version
The four-character version (yojijukugo) appears to be a later invention. Historian Masaya Suzuki, citing the work of an authority on the military insignia of the time, argues that there is no evidence in the historical record for the four-character phrase, and that it became popular with the publication of a historical novel of the same name by Yasushi Inoue in 1953.

Use in popular culture
The character Ryu from the video game series Street Fighter has the Furinkazan on his belt as well as highly stylised versions of the Japanese symbols on his gloves.  The symbols can also be seen to the left of the character's stage in the game Street Fighter II.

See also
Fūrin Kazan (TV series)

Notes

Japanese heraldry